This is a list of Army Black Knights football players in the NFL Draft.

Key

Selections

References

Army

Army Black Knights NFL Draft